Vyacheslav Igorevich Andryushchenko (born July 4, 1989) is a Belarusian ice hockey forward playing for Metallurg Zhlobin of the Belarusian Extraliga.

Career 
Andryushchenko competed in the 2013 IIHF World Championship as a member of the Belarus men's national ice hockey team. He played for HC Neftekhimik Nizhnekamsk during the 2014–2015 season.

References

1989 births
Living people
Belarusian ice hockey forwards
HC Khimik Voskresensk players
HC Lada Togliatti players
HC Neftekhimik Nizhnekamsk players
HC Neman Grodno players
Keramin Minsk players
Metallurg Zhlobin players
Neftyanik Almetyevsk players
Rubin Tyumen players
Saryarka Karagandy players
Shinnik Bobruisk players
Sokol Krasnoyarsk players
Ice hockey people from Minsk
Sputnik Nizhny Tagil players
Yunost Minsk players
Yuzhny Ural Orsk players
Zauralie Kurgan players